Delhi is a ghost town in Delhi Township, Osborne County, Kansas, United States.

History
Delhi was issued a post office in 1875. The post office was discontinued in 1894.  There is nothing left of Delhi.

References

Former populated places in Osborne County, Kansas
Former populated places in Kansas